Jamuna River is a tributary of the Ichamati River. It flows through the Indian state of West Bengal and is one of the major rivers of the North 24 Parganas district.

References

Rivers of West Bengal
Rivers of India